Kalak Jafar (also Romanized as Kalak Ja‘far) is a village in Mansuri Rural District, Homeyl District, Eslamabad-e Gharb County, Kermanshah Province, Iran. At the 2006 census, its population was 46, in 10 families.

References 

Populated places in Eslamabad-e Gharb County